Diplacus aurantiacus, the sticky monkey-flower or orange bush monkey-flower, is a flowering plant that grows in a subshrub form, native to southwestern North America from southwestern Oregon south through most of California. It is a member of the lopseed family, Phrymaceae. It was formerly known as Mimulus aurantiacus.

Description
Diplacus aurantiacus grows up to 1.2 meters (4 feet) tall, has deep green, sticky leaves 3 to 7 centimeters long and up to a centimeter broad and flowering stems that grow vertically. The flowers are tubular at the base and about 2 centimeters long with five broad lobes; they occur in a variety of shades from white to red, the most common color being a light orange. They are honey plants pollinated by bees and hummingbirds.

It grows in many climates and will thrive in many types of soil, wet, dry, sandy, or rocky. It even grows in serpentine, a soil that most plants have difficulty thriving in because of its unique mineral composition.

Diplacus aurantiacus is an important host plant for the larvae of the common buckeye butterfly (Junonia coenia) and the variable checkerspot (Euphydryas chalcedona), despite a phenolic resin in the leaves which deter its feeding. This resin also helps the plant retain water in dry environments.

Cultivation
This bushy evergreen shrub can be short-lived in cultivation. The species and its cultivars are used in water conserving, native plant, and habitat gardens. It is often grown under glass in temperate zones.
In the UK it has won the Royal Horticultural Society's Award of Garden Merit.

Traditional Native American medical plant
The Miwok and Pomo Native Americans used the plant to treat minor ailments such as sores, burns, diarrhea, and eye irritation. They used the colorful flowers for decorative purposes.

Gallery

References

External links

Mimulus aurantiacus. CalFlora. 
 USDA Plants profile for Diplacus aurantiacus. USDA PLANTS.
 ITIS−Integrated Taxonomic Information System: Diplacus aurantiacus. Integrated Taxonomic Information System (ITIS)
 Mimulus aurantiacus. CalPhotos.

aurantiacus
Flora of California
Flora of Oregon
Flora of the Cascade Range
Flora of the Klamath Mountains
Flora of the Sierra Nevada (United States)
Flora of the California desert regions
Flora of the Sonoran Deserts
Natural history of the California chaparral and woodlands
Natural history of the California Coast Ranges
Natural history of the Central Valley (California)
Natural history of the Channel Islands of California
Natural history of the Colorado Desert
Natural history of the Peninsular Ranges
Natural history of the San Francisco Bay Area
Natural history of the Santa Monica Mountains
Natural history of the Transverse Ranges
Plants used in traditional Native American medicine
Garden plants of North America
Drought-tolerant plants
Bird food plants
Flora without expected TNC conservation status